The Hamedan Museum of Natural History is a natural history museum located in the Bu-Ali Sina University in Hamedan, north-western Iran.

It is noted for its presentation of large horned Alborz red sheep and a black vulture. It also has a considerable taxidermic collection of animals and insects. The museum has an aquarium and live fish tanks.

The museum has several exhibition halls. The first hall of this museum is the Persian Gulf Hall, which houses a variety of bivalves, gastropods, snails, crustaceans, corals and sponges of the Persian Gulf. 

The second hall is dedicated to the insects and contains various insects of different kinds. This hall also houses the most beautiful butterflies found in Iran. 

The third hall is for mammals and birds, and the collection of birds and mammals of Iran, which have a special value and prestige, is placed in this hall.

References

External links
Best Iran Travel

Tourist attractions in Hamadan Province
Natural history museums in Iran
Buildings and structures in Hamadan Province